The Midmarket Institute is an organization based in Princeton, New Jersey, that offers "in-person events, publishing, sponsored research and advocacy" to middle-market companies, which the institute defines as firms with annual revenues between $10 million and $500 million and with 100 to 5,000 employees.

The company was founded in 2009 by Ram V. Iyer, who is now its president.

References

External links
  "Secrets of a Midmarket Powerhouse," German-American Trade, July–August 2012
  Kathleen Goolsby, "What's Wrong With Business Solutions for the Midmarket?" Outsourcing Buzz, October 20, 2012 (Interview with Ram Iyer)
 http://www.blogtalkradio.com/theartoftheceo/2016/02/01/get-off-your-plateau-mid-market-solutions. Get Off Your Plateau – Mid-Market Solutions on BlogTalkRadio's 'The Art of the CEO' with Bart Jackson. February 1, 2016.
 http://theartoftheceo.com/get-off-your-plateau-mid-market-solutions-mid-market-growth-expert-ram-v-iyer-helps-companies/. 'The Art of the CEO' Mid-market growth expert Ram V. Iyer helps companies. February 3, 2016.

Organizations based in Princeton, New Jersey